6 was a common year starting on Friday (link will display the full calendar) of the Julian calendar. In the Roman Empire, it was known as the Year of the Consulship of Lepidus and Lucius Arruntius (or, less frequently, year 759 Ab urbe condita). The denomination "AD 6" for this year has been used since the early medieval period, when the Anno Domini calendar era became the prevalent method in Europe for naming years.

Events

By place

Roman Empire 
 Due to a catastrophic fire in Rome, the barracks system - the vigiles, initially manned only by freedmen - is created by the Princeps Augustus to allow quicker response to outbreaks of fire in the city.
 Due to a food shortage in Rome, Augustus doubles the grain rations distributed to the people, sends away his slave retinue, and places the senate in recess indefinitely. 
 The Princeps Augustus sets up a treasury, the aerarium militare (170 million sestertii), with the specific purpose of paying bonuses to retiring legion veterans. This is financed by a 5% tax on inheritances, a system said to have been suggested in Julius Caesar's memoirs.
 The Temple of Castor and Pollux is rededicated in Rome to Tiberius.
 A pamphletting campaign in Rome is quashed by the Princeps Augustus. Publius Plautius Rufus is accused but found innocent of the crime.
 Princeps Augustus banishes Agrippa Postumus, one of his adopted sons, to the island of Planasia.
 Tiberius makes Carnuntum his base of operations against Maroboduus; The Roman legion XX Valeria Victrix fight with Tiberius against the Marcomanni.
 The building of a Roman fort signifies the origin of the city of Wiesbaden.
 The Illyrian tribes in Dalmatia and Pannonia revolt and begin the Bellum Batonianum or Great Illyrian Revolt. 
 Troops are levied in Rome to send to Illyricum from freedmen and slaves freed specifically for the purpose.
 Tiberius marches back from the northern border to Illyricum to commence operations against the Illyrians.
 Gaius Caecina Severus is made governor of Moesia, and is heavily involved in the first battles of the Bellum Batonianum or Great Illyrian Revolt.
 Marcus Plautius Silvanus is made governor of Galatia and Pamphylia and suppresses an uprising of the Isaurians in Pamphylia. 
 Herod Archelaus, ethnarch of Samaria, Judea, and Idumea, is deposed and banished to Vienne in Gaul.
 Iudaea and Moesia become Roman provinces destroying the Dardani. 
 Quirinius conducts a census in Judea (according to Josephus), which results in a revolt in the province, led by Judas of Galilee, and supported by the Pharisee Zadok. The revolt is repressed, and the rebels are crucified, but it results in the birth of the Zealot movement, the members of which regard the God of Judaism as their only master.

China 
 January – Some Chinese fear for the life of the young, ailing Emperor Ping Di as the planet Mars disappears behind the moon this month.
 February 3 – The boy emperor, Ping Di, dies of unexpected causes at age 14; Wang Mang alone selects the new emperor, Ruzi Ying, age 2, starting the Jushe era of the Han Dynasty.
 Candidates for government office must take civil-service examinations.
 The imperial Liu clan suspects the intentions of Wang Mang and foment agrarian rebellions during the course of Ruzi Ying's reign. The first of these is led by Liu Chong, Marquess of Ang-Zong (a/k/a Marquis of An-chung), with a small force starting in May or June.

Births 
 Gaius Manlius Valens, Roman senator and consul (d. AD 96)
 John the Apostle, Jewish Christian mystic (approximate date)
 Marcus Aemilius Lepidus, Roman politician (d. AD 39)
 Milonia Caesonia, Roman empress (d. AD 41)
 Nero Julius Caesar, son of Germanicus and Agrippina the Elder (d. AD 30)

Deaths 
 February 3 – Ping, Chinese emperor of the Han Dynasty (b. 9 BC)
 Cleopatra Selene II, Egyptian ruler of Cyrenaica and Libya (b. 40 BC)
 Orodes III, king (shah) of the Parthian Empire
 Terentia, wife of Marcus Tullius Cicero (b. 98 BC)

References

Sources 

 

 

als:0er#Johr 6